Lauren Davis was the defending champion, having won the event in 2012, but she decided to participate at the 2013 Ningbo International Women's Tennis Open instead.

Melanie Oudin won the title, defeating Coco Vandeweghe in the final, 5–7, 6–3, 6–3.

Seeds

Main draw

Finals

Top half

Bottom half

References 
 Main draw

Party Rock Open - Singles
2013 Party Rock Open
Party Rock Open